Dominique-Paul Peyronnet (1872, Talence1943, Paris), was a French naïve painter.

After retiring from the military in 1920, he began to paint landscapes and exhibited at the Salon des Indépendants between 1932 and 1935. The detailed focus of his canvases and his simplified motifs triggered comparisons with Henri Rousseau.

Peyronnet is known to have produced around thirty paintings, mostly pastoral and sylvan landscapes, river scenes, and seascapes. His level of detail is contained by bold, linear compositional structures to produce a taut yet placid mood. Ferryman of the Moselle, won the Paul Guillaume prize in 1936. Peyronnet drew on his own strenuous experience of war to produce a resonant and poetic image.

References
Cahill, Holger, et al. Masters of Popular Painting: Modern Primitives of Europe and America. New York: The Museum of Modern Art, 1938.
Wolf, Falk, and Kasper König, eds. The Shadow of the Avant-Garde: Rousseau and the Forgotten Masters. Berlin: Hatje Cantz, 2016.

19th-century French painters
French male painters
20th-century French painters
Naïve painters
1872 births
1943 deaths
19th-century French male artists